A kaya (plural makaya or kayas) is a sacred forest of the Mijikenda people in the former Coast Province of Kenya. A kaya is considered to be an intrinsic source of ritual power and the origin of cultural identity; it is also a place of prayer for members of the Mijikenda ethnic group. The settlement, ritual centre, and fortified enclosure associated with the forest are also part of the kaya. In the present day, the kaya is also referred to as a traditional organizational unit of the Mijikenda. Eleven of the approximately 30 separate makaya have been grouped together and inscribed as the Sacred Mijikenda Kaya Forests, a UNESCO World Heritage Site.

Geography
More than 50 makaya have been identified within the Kwale, Mombasa, and Kilifi counties. They measure between 30 and 300 hectares each. While visitors are not allowed to enter most makaya, Kaya Kinondo, a 30-hectare forest on Diani Beach, allows visitors and falls under the auspices of the Kaya Kinondo Ecotourism Project.

History
Many makaya were originally fortified villages of various ethnic groups, including the Digo, Chonyi, Kambe, Duruma, Kauma, Ribe, Rabai, Jibana, and Giriama peoples. The villages have lowland tropical forest areas in their surrounds and were reached via paths through the forest. The forest flora was used solely for the collection of medicinal herbs. The practices of tree cutting, livestock grazing, and farmland clearing were not permitted within a kaya.

In the present day, intensive deforestation for agricultural use and logging necessitated declaring 38 kaya forest areas legally as national monuments. Local communities manage these areas.

Wildlife and conservation
Wildlife in the Kaya Kinodao area has been identified which can be visited as part of ecotourism project. 187 species of plant, 48 species of bird, and 45 species of butterfly have been identified. Colobus monkeys and golden-rumped elephant shrews have also been reported.

Entry into the forest was dictated by the traditional rules set by a governing body called the ngambi formed by elderly members of the community. This governing body was primarily concerned with its management, conservation and utilization of the biological resources in adherence to the traditional beliefs about the sacredness of the forest. However, the creation of a central governing body has affected the role of the local elders.

An ecotourism project was launched in 2001 with funds provided by the Ford Foundation with the objective of generating income for the local people and encouraging ecotourism to help preserve the sacredness of the forests.  Eleven Mijikenda makaya were grouped together and inscribed as the Sacred Mijikenda Kaya Forests, a World Heritage Site, in 2008 under criteria (iii), (v), and (vi).

Culture
Fingo (protective talismans) are buried in the kaya and are cared for by kaya elders who protect the traditions of the Mijikenda. Mijikenda believe that they brought the fingo charms from their ancestral home of Shungwaya, a myth of origin. In the present day, many fingo are lost or stolen, considered to be objet d'art.

There are many myths and beliefs narrated by the local women of the area which relate to the sacredness of these forests. It is the general belief that the forests are inhabited by spirits. Some of them believe that cutting a tree with a machete could result in the machete rebounding and causing injury to the leg which could be healed only by offering cloth to village elders in a ceremony. It is also believed that food cooked using wood from these sacred forest could cause sickness, and also that a dwelling built with timber drawn from the forest would collapse. The conservation of the sacredness of the forest was aimed at preserving its darkness.

References

Bibliography

External links
The kaya forests in Kenya sacred sites listed by Unesco online video (14 min)

Mijikenda
Forests of Kenya
World Heritage Sites in Kenya
Sacred groves
Archaeology of Eastern Africa